Stainforth railway station was a station on the South Yorkshire Railway's line between Doncaster and Thorne, serving the town of Stainforth, South Yorkshire, England.

History and description

The original SYR line from Doncaster to Thorne followed closely the Stainforth and Keadby Canal and opened for goods traffic on 11 December 1855. The original passenger station opened with the coming of passenger services to the line on 7 July 1856 and closed on 1 October 1866 when the station was resited on the 'straightened' line.

A new station opened on the realigned route away from the canal as Stainforth and Hatfield, but was renamed Hatfield and Stainforth in the 1990s.

References
"The South Yorkshire Railway", D.L. Franks,1971, Turntable Enterprises. 

Disused railway stations in Doncaster
Former South Yorkshire Railway stations
Railway stations in Great Britain opened in 1856
Railway stations in Great Britain closed in 1866